The sayings of Jesus on the cross (sometimes called the Seven Last Words from the Cross) are seven expressions biblically attributed to  during his crucifixion. Traditionally, the brief sayings have been called "words".

The seven sayings are gathered from the four canonical gospels. In Matthew and Mark, Jesus cries out to God. In Luke, he forgives his killers, reassures the penitent thief, and commends his spirit to the Father. In John, he speaks to his mother, says he thirsts, and declares the end of his earthly life. This is an example of the Christian approach to the construction of a gospel harmony, in which material from different gospels is combined, producing an account that goes beyond each gospel.

Since the 16th century, these sayings have been widely used in sermons on Good Friday, and entire books have been written on theological analysis of them. The Seven Last Words from the Cross are an integral part of the liturgy in the Anglican, Catholic, Protestant, and other Christian traditions. Several composers have set the sayings to music.

Overview 
In the following table, the seven sayings are arranged according to their traditional order. However, all seven sayings cannot be found in any one account of Jesus' crucifixion. The ordering is a harmonisation of the texts from each of the four canonical gospels. Three of the sayings appear only in Luke and three only in John. One other saying appears both in Matthew and Mark, and another ("It is finished") is only directly quoted in John but alluded to in Matthew and Mark.

Quotations here and throughout this article are taken from the King James translation, except where otherwise noted.

Theological interpretations
Traditionally, these seven sayings are called words of:
 Forgiveness,
 Salvation,
 Relationship,
 Abandonment,
 Distress,
 Triumph, and
 Reunion.

The sayings form part of a Christian meditation that is often used during Lent, Holy Week and Good Friday.

Priest and author Timothy Radcliffe sees the number seven as significant, as the number of perfection in the Bible. He writes that as God created the world in seven days, "these seven words belong to God's completion of that creation".

Historicity
James Dunn considers the seven sayings weakly rooted in tradition and sees them as a part of the elaborations in the diverse retellings of Jesus' final hours. He does, however, argue in favour of the authenticity of the Mark/Matthew saying, in which Jesus seems to describe himself as forsaken by God. This would have been an embarrassment to the early Church, and hence would likely not have been invented. Leslie Houlden states that Luke may have deliberately excluded this saying from his gospel because it did not fit in with the model of Jesus he was presenting.

The seven sayings

1. Father, forgive them; for they know not what they do 

This first saying of Jesus on the cross is traditionally called "The Word of Forgiveness". It is theologically interpreted as Jesus' prayer for forgiveness for the Roman soldiers who were crucifying him and all others who were involved in his crucifixion.

Some early manuscripts do not include this sentence in Luke 23:34. Biblical scholars such as Bart Ehrman have argued that it was omitted by some scribes because of anti-Judaic sentiment around the second century.

2.  shalt thou be with me in paradise 
 

This saying is traditionally called "The Word of Salvation". According to the Gospel of Luke, Jesus was crucified between two thieves (traditionally named Dismas and Gestas), one of whom supports Jesus' innocence and asks him to remember him when he comes into his kingdom. Jesus replies, "Verily I say unto thee...", followed with the only appearance of the word "Paradise" in the gospels (originally from Persian , "paradise garden").

A seemingly simple change in punctuation in this saying has been the subject of doctrinal differences among Christian groups, given the lack of punctuation in the original Greek texts. Catholics and most Protestant Christians usually use a version which reads "today you will be with me in Paradise". This reading assumes a direct voyage to Heaven and has no implications of purgatory. On the other hand, some Protestants who believe in soul sleep have used a reading which emphasizes "I say to you today", leaving open the possibility that the statement was made today, but arrival in Heaven may be later.

3. Woman, behold, thy son! Behold, thy mother! 

 

This statement is traditionally called "The Word of Relationship" and in it Jesus entrusts Mary, his mother, into the care of "the disciple whom Jesus loved".

Jesus also addresses his mother as "woman" in John 2:4. Although this sounds dismissive in English, the Greek word is a term of respect or tenderness. Catholic commentators, on the basis of these two passages, often connect Mary with the "woman" of Genesis 3:15, and the "woman clothed with the sun" in Revelation 12, and therefore see this title of "woman" as a justification for the veneration of Mary as a second Eve.

4. My God, my God, why hast thou forsaken me?

This is the only saying which appears in more than one gospel, and is a quote from Psalm 22:1. In both accounts, the words spoken by Jesus have been transliterated from Aramaic into Greek, and there are slight differences between the two versions. These differences are most probably due to dialect. Matthew's version seems to have been more influenced by Hebrew, whereas Mark's is perhaps more colloquial.

In the verses immediately following this saying, in both gospels, the onlookers who hear Jesus' cry mistakenly believe him to be calling for help from Elijah.

This saying is taken by some as an abandonment of the Son by the Father. Another interpretation holds that at the moment when Jesus took upon himself the sins of humanity, the Father had to turn away from the Son because the Father is "of purer eyes than to see evil and cannot look at wrong" (ESV). Other theologians understand the cry as that of one who was truly human and who felt forsaken. Put to death by his foes, very largely deserted by his friends, he may have also felt deserted by God.

Others see these words in the context of Psalm 22 and suggest that Jesus recited these words, perhaps even the whole psalm, "that he might show himself to be the very Being to whom the words refer; so that the Jewish scribes and people might examine and see the cause why he would not descend from the cross; namely, because this very psalm showed that it was appointed that he should suffer these things."

A. T. Robertson noted that the "so-called Gospel of Peter 1.5 preserves this saying in a Docetic (Cerinthian) form: 'My power, my power, thou hast forsaken me!

5. I thirst

This statement is traditionally called "The Word of Distress" and is compared and contrasted with the encounter of Jesus with the Samaritan woman at the well in John 4.

Only John records this saying, but all four gospels relate that Jesus was offered a drink of sour wine. In Mark and Matthew, a sponge was soaked in the wine and lifted up to Jesus on a reed; John says the same, but states that the sponge was affixed to a hyssop branch. This may have been intended as symbolically significant, as hyssop branches are often mentioned in the Old Testament in the context of the use of sacrificial blood for ritual purification.

This statement of Jesus is interpreted by John as fulfilment of the prophecy given in Psalm 69:21, "in my thirst they gave me vinegar to drink"; hence the quotation from John's gospel includes the comment "that the scripture might be fulfilled". The Jerusalem Bible cross-references Psalm 22:15: "my palate is drier than a potsherd, and my tongue is stuck to my jaw".

6. It is finished

This statement is traditionally called "The Word of Triumph" and is theologically interpreted as the announcement of the end of the earthly life of Jesus, in anticipation for the Resurrection.

The verse has also been translated as "It is consummated." On business documents or receipts it has been used to denote "The debt is paid in full".

The utterance after consuming the beverage and immediately before death is mentioned, but not explicitly quoted, in Mark 15:37 and Matthew 27:50 (both of which state that Jesus "cried with a loud voice, and gave up the ghost").

7. Father, into thy hands I commend my spirit 
 

From Psalm 31:5, this saying, which is an announcement and not a request, is traditionally called "The Word of Reunion" and is theologically interpreted as the proclamation of Jesus joining God the Father in Heaven.

The words of Luke 23:46, or the fuller Psalm 31:5, have subsequently been attributed as last words of famous people, especially those considered pious Christians, such as martyrs or saints. These include 
Philip the Apostle (died AD 80), Basil the Great (AD 379), Charlemagne (died 814), Ansgar (865), Thomas Becket (1170), Jan Hus (1415), Christopher Columbus (1506), Ludovica Albertoni (1533), Martin Luther (1546), George Wishart (1546), Lady Jane Grey (1554), her father Henry, Duke of Suffolk (1555), Thomas of Villanova (1555), Mary, Queen of Scots (1587), Aloysius Gonzaga (1591), Torquato Tasso (1595), Turibius of Mogrovejo (1606), John Bruen (1625), George Herbert (1633), Covenanters including Hugh Mackail (1666) and James Renwick (1688), and Christian Friedrich Schwarz (1798).

See also
 Musical settings of sayings of Jesus on the cross
 Stations of the Cross
 Aramaic of Jesus
 Crucifixion of Jesus
 Life of Jesus in the New Testament
 Three Hours' Agony

References

Bibliography

Further reading

Crucifixion of Jesus
New Testament words and phrases
Sayings of Jesus
Last words